Seleva is a rural locality (a village) in Verkh-Invenskoye Rural Settlement, Kudymkarsky District, Perm Krai, Russia. The population was 12 as of 2010. There is 1 street.

Geography 
Seleva is located 42 km west of Kudymkar (the district's administrative centre) by road. Yarasheva is the nearest rural locality.

References 

Rural localities in Kudymkarsky District